Barbara Piecha (born 4 March 1948, in Katowice) is a Polish luger who competed during the early 1970s. She won two medals in the women's singles event at the FIL World Luge Championships with a gold in 1970 and a bronze in 1971. She competed at the 1972 Winter Olympics and the 1976 Winter Olympics.

Piecha also won a bronze medal in the women's singles at the 1971 FIL European Luge Championships in Imst, Austria.

References

External links
Hickok sports information on World champions in luge and skeleton.
List of European luge champions 
SportQuick.com information on World champions in luge 

Polish female lugers
Living people
1948 births
Sportspeople from Katowice
Olympic lugers of France
Lugers at the 1972 Winter Olympics
Lugers at the 1976 Winter Olympics
20th-century Polish women